Auberville-la-Renault is a commune in the Seine-Maritime department in the Normandy region in northern France.

Geography

Heraldry

Population

Places of interest
 The church of St.Maclou, dating from the thirteenth century.
 Ruins of a medieval castle donjon.
 The nineteenth-century château de Glatigny.
 Traces of the old château d'Alvémont, now a farm.

See also
Communes of the Seine-Maritime department

References

Communes of Seine-Maritime